Valeria Sabel (7 April 1928 – 18 August 2009) was an Italian actress. She appeared in more than sixty films from 1964 to 2009. In Godfather III she played the role of Sister Vincenza.

Selected filmography

References

External links 

1928 births
2009 deaths
Italian film actresses